The CG Railway  is a terminal railroad as reported by the Association of American Railroads.  The CGR is headquartered in Mobile, Alabama, and is owned and operated by a 50/50 joint venture between SEACOR Holdings and Genesee & Wyoming. The railroad operates an approximate  train ferry between the Port of Mobile at Mobile, Alabama, and the Port of Coatzacoalcos in Coatzacoalcos, Veracruz.  It began operations in 2000 out of Mobile, Alabama.  In 2004 the railroad moved its American port to New Orleans, Louisiana. The Port of New Orleans facility was heavily damaged by Hurricane Katrina in 2005. In 2007 the Alabama State Port Authority agreed to construct a state of the art $19 million rail-ferry terminal at the Port of Mobile. The CGR connects with CSX Transportation, Norfolk Southern, BNSF Railway, Canadian National Railway, and Alabama and Gulf Coast Railway all at Mobile, Alabama, and Ferrocarril del Sureste at Coatzacoalcos, Veracruz.

The railroad operates two double deck rail-ferries. The vessels MV Cherokee and MV Banda Sea operate between the two ports up to four times a week.  Because the Banda Sea had been originally built with a single cargo deck, the vessel was limited to carrying rail cars on its main deck. In 2004, CGR contracted Naval Architects Bennett & Associates to increase the Banda Sea's carrying capacity by adding a second deck. The Banda Sea is capable of carrying 115 railcars. Bennett & Associates also designed a bilevel adjustable ramp at each dock to allow rail cars to be loaded on both decks. Railcar loading and unloading is performed by the Terminal Railway Alabama State Docks at Mobile and by Ferrocarril del Sureste at Coatzacoalcos.  The railroad operates two trackmobiles at each port to help with loading and unloading of railcars. The CGR transports approximately 10,000 railcars annually, carrying commodities such as chemicals & plastics, fructose & refined sugar, steel and pulp & paper.

See also 

 Ferrocarril Transístmico 
 Isthmus of Tehuantepec

References

External links 
 
 New ferry
 Launch of new ferry, delivery of second

Alabama railroads
Switching and terminal railroads
Railway companies of Mexico
Standard gauge railways in Mexico
Train ferries
Genesee & Wyoming